The Roman Catholic Diocese of Nevers is a diocese of the Latin Church of the Roman Catholic Church in France. The diocese comprises the department of Nièvre, in the Region of Bourgogne.

Suppressed by the Concordat of 1801 and united to the See of Autun, it was re-established in 1823 as suffragan of the Archdiocese of Sens and took over a part of the former Diocese of Autun and a part of the ancient Diocese of Auxerre.

History

The Gallia Christiana mentions as first Bishop of Nevers St. Eladius, restored to health in the reign of Clovis by St. Severinus, Abbot of St. Maurice. According to Louis Duchesne, the first authentic bishop is Tauricanus, present at the Council of Epaone in 517.

A number of former bishops of Nevers are venerated as saints: St. Jerome (800–816) who rebuilt the cathedral in honour of the martyrs Cyricus and Julitta, which until then had been dedicated to Saints Gervasius and Protasius. It is possible that in the 7th century three other saints occupied the See of Nevers: St. Diè (Deodatus), the same perhaps who died a hermit in the Vosges.

The following bishops of Nevers were notable: 
the future cardinal Pierre Bertrandi (1320–22) who, in 1329–30, defended ecclesiastical immunities against the barons in the celebrated conferences of Paris and Vincennes presided over by Philip VI of France;
Charles, Cardinal de Bourbon (1540–47) subsequently cardinal and whom the Leaguers wished to make King of France under the name of Charles X; 
Jacques Spifame (1548–58) who became a Calvinist in 1559, and was afterwards accused of forgery and beheaded at Geneva in 1566; 
the polemicist Sorbin de Ste-Foi (1578–1606), the Confessor of King Charles IX and a voluminous writer.

Among the saints of this diocese must be mentioned: 
Sts. Paul, priest; Péreux and Pélerin, martyrs between 272 and 303; 
St. Paroze (Patritius), Abbot of Nevers in the 6th century; 
the hermit St. Franchy (Francovæcus); the priest St. Vincent of Magny in the 9th century; 
the blessed Nicholas Applaine, once Canon of the collegiate church of Prémery (15th century), whose cassock Louis XI demanded of Bishop Pierre de Fontenay. 
Claude Fauchet, constitutional Bishop of Calvados during the Revolution, was a native of the diocese.

The Abbey of La Charité sur Loire, founded in 1056, and known as the "eldest daughter" of Cluny, was inaugurated on 9 March 1107 by Pope Paschal II; Bishop Hervé of Nevers was present. The celebrated Suger of Saint-Denis, then a simple cleric, has left an account of the ceremony.

The Benedictine Abbey of Corbigny, founded under Charlemagne, was occupied by the Huguenots in 1563, as a basis of operations.

Bernadette Soubirous, the visionary of Lourdes, died in the Convent of the Sisters of Charity and Christian Instruction in Nevers, 16 April 1879. The chief places of pilgrimage in the diocese are: Notre Dame de Pitié, at St. Martin d'Heuille, dating from the 14th century; Notre Dame de Fauboulvin at Corancy, dating from 1590; Notre Dame du Morvan at Dun-sur-Grandry, dating from 1876.

Among the congregations for women which originated in the diocese must be mentioned: the Ursuline nuns, a teaching order founded in 1622 at Nevers by the Duke of Gonzaga and the Nevers aldermen; the Hospitallers, founded in 1639 at La Charité-sur-Loire by Sister Médard-Varlet; the congregation of Sisters of Charity and Christian Instruction of Nevers, founded in 1680, with mother-house at Nevers.

Bishops

To 1000

c. 506: St Euladius
c. 517: Tauricianus
c. 538–c. 541: Rusticus
c. 549–c. 552: Aregius (Aridius)
Euphronius
c. 567: St Aeoladius (Eloade)
c. 580 – 26 February 594: Agricola
Fulcilius
c. 624–c. 653: Rauracus
c. 658: Leodebaudus
c. 660: Hecherius
c. 665 – 668 : Deodatus (St Dié)
c. 666: Gilbert
c. 672: Rogus
c. 691: St Itier
c. 696–c. 697: Ebarcius
c. 702: Opportunus
c. 726: Nectarius
c. 747: Chebroaldus
Raginfredus (Raginfroi)
Waldo
c. 800–816: Hieronymus (Jerome)
c. 817–c. 829: Jonas
c. 833: Gerfredus (Gerfroi)
Hugo I.
c. 840 – 22 July 860: Hériman
Raginus
c. 861: Abbo I.
c. 864: Luido
866–c. 884: Abbo II.
c. 886–c. 892: Emmenus
[c. 893: Adalgaire (?)]
894–c. 905: Franco
c. 906–c. 914: Atto
c. 916: Launo
c. 935–c. 947: Tedalgrin
948–c. 955: Gaubert
c. 958: Gérard
959–979 or 980: Natran, O.S.B.
980–c. 1011: Roclenus

1000 to 1300

1013 – May 1065 : Hugues II. de Champ-Allemand
c. 1066 – 1 June 1074 : Malguin
1. November 1074 – c. 1090 : Hugues III. de Champ-Allemand
c. 1096 – c. 1099 : Gui
18 December 1099 – 8 August 1109 : Hervé
1110 – c. 1120 : Hugues IV.
1121 – c. 1145 : Fromond
1146 – 1159 : Geoffroi
1160 – 14 January 1177 : Bernard de Saint-Saulge
1177 – 25 April 1188 : Theobaldus (Thibaut)
1188 – 15 June 1196 : Jean I.
1196 – 11 January 1202 : Gauthier
c. 1204 – 19 May 1221 : Guillaume I. de Saint-Lazare
1222 – 4 December 1222 : Gervais de Châteauneuf
1223 – 28 July 1230 : Renaud I.
1232 – c. 1240 : Raoul de Beauvais
1240 – 1252 or 1253 : Robert Cornut
1252 or 1253 – 1254 : Henri Cornut
1254 – 31 May 1260 : Guillaume II de Grandpuy
c. 1262 – 14 January 1273 : Robert II. de Marzi
1273–1285 : Gilles de Châteaurenaud
23 July 1285 – 28 July 1294 : Gilles II. du Chastelet
28 March 1294 – 4 June 1314: Jean II. de Savigny

1300 to 1500

1314 – 2 February 1319 : Guillaume III. Beaufils
28 January 1320 – 19 May 1322 : Pierre Bertrand
19 May 1322 – 1332 : Bertrand I. Gascon
1333 – 12 September 1334 : Jean III. Mandevillain
20 January 1335 – 15 March 1339 : Pierre Bertrand de Colombier
15 March 1339 – c. 1357 : Bertrand II. (Tissandier)
6 November 1359 – 1361 : Renaud II. des Moulins
2 August 1361 – 1371 : Pierre Aycelin de Montaigut
1371–1372 : Jean IV. de Neufchâtel
1374–1380 : Pierre V. de Dinteville
1381 – 16 January 1395 : Maurice de Coulange-la-Vineuse (Avignon Obedience)
1395–1400 : Philippe I. Froment (Avignon Obedience)
1401 – 22 July 1430 : Robert III. de Dangueil (Avignon Obedience)
1430–1436 : Jean V. Germain
30 August 1436 – 1444 : Jean VI. Vivien
8 October 1445 – ? : Jean Troufon 
[1446]/1448 – 1461: Jean VII. d'Étampes
23 September 1461 – 3 June 1499: Pierre VI. de Fontenai

1500 to 1800

24 January 1500 – 1505: Philip of Cleves
9 August 1503 – 31 May 1505: Niccolò Fieschi, Administrator
31 May 1505 – 12 September 1507 : Antoine de Fleurs
29 October 1508 – 30 July 1512 : Jean VII. Bohier
9 January 1513 – 11 February 1519 : Imbert de la Platière de Bourdillon
13 March 1519 – 22 April 1539 : Jacques I. d'Albret
5 June 1540 – 23 January 1545 : Charles, Cardinal de Bourbon
5 May 1546 – 1558 : Jacques Spifame
27 January 1559 – 7 April 1578: Gilles Spifame
22 July 1578 – 1 March 1606 : Arnaud Sarbin de Sainte-Foi
19 November 1606 – 17 June 1643 : Eustache I. du Lys
1643–1666: Eustache II. de Chéri
28 August 1667 – 3 September 1705 : Edouard I. Valot
1705 – 20 July 1719: Edouard II Bargedé
1719 – 20 February 1740: Charles II Fontaine des Montées
1740 – 4 April 1751: Guillaume IV d'Hugues
4 April 1751 – 1782: Jean-Antoine Tinseau
5 January 1783 – 1788: Pierre VII. de Séguiran
1789–1790: Louis-Jérôme de Suffren de Saint-Tropez
1791–1801: Guillaume Tollet (Constitutional Bishop of Nièvre)

From 1800

1823–1829: Jean-Baptiste-François-Nicolas Millaux
1829–1834: Charles de Douhet d'Auzers
1834–1842: Paul Naudo (later Archbishop of Avignon)
1842–1860: Dominique-Augustin Dufêtre
1860–1873: Théodore-Augustin Forcade, M.E.P. (later Archbishop of Aix)
1873–1877: Thomas-Casimir-François de Ladoue
1877–1903: Etienne-Antoine-Alfred Lelong
1906–1910: François-Léon Gauthey (later Archbishop of Besançon)
1910–1932: Pierre Chatelus
1932–1963: Patrice Flynn
1963–1966: Michel-Louis Vial (later Bishop of Nantes)
1966–1987: Jean-François-Marie Streiff
1988–1997: Michel Paul Marie Moutel, P.S.S.
1998–2011: François Joseph Pierre Deniau
2011–present: Thierry Marie Jacques Brac de la Perrière

See also
 Catholic Church in France

References

Sources

Reference works
  pp. 333–334. (in Latin)
 p. 189 (in Latin)

 p. 237 (in Latin)
 p. 263 (in Latin)
 p. 284. (in Latin)

Studies

External links

  Centre national des Archives de l'Église de France, L’Épiscopat francais depuis 1919, retrieved: 2016-12-24.
Catholic Encyclopedia article

Acknowledgment

Nevers
Nevers